The 1977 Western Australian state election was held on 19 February 1977.

Retiring Members

Labor

 John Tonkin MLA (Melville)
 Harry Fletcher MLA (Fremantle)
 Donald May MLA (Clontarf)
 Tom Hartrey MLA (Boulder-Dundas)

Liberal

 Ross Hutchinson MLA (Cottesloe)
 Arthur Griffith MLC (North Metropolitan)
 Charles Abbey MLC (West)

National Country
 Thomas Perry MLC (Lower Central)
 Jack Heitman MLC (Upper West) (died before term ended)

Legislative Assembly
Sitting members are shown in bold text. Successful candidates are highlighted in the relevant colour. Where there is possible confusion, an asterisk (*) is also used.

Legislative Council

Sitting members are shown in bold text. Successful candidates are highlighted in the relevant colour. Where there is possible confusion, an asterisk (*) is also used.

See also
 Members of the Western Australian Legislative Assembly, 1974–1977
 Members of the Western Australian Legislative Assembly, 1977–1980
 Members of the Western Australian Legislative Council, 1974–1977
 Members of the Western Australian Legislative Council, 1977–1980
 1977 Western Australian state election

References
 

Candidates for Western Australian state elections